Nebojša Đorđević is a former professional tennis player from Serbia.

Career
Đorđević appeared regularly in the Davis Cup competition during the 1990s, first for Yugoslavia then for the team now known as Serbia. He won seven of the 18 rubbers that he played in, finishing with a 2/6 record in singles and 5/5 record in doubles.

Primarily a doubles player, Đorđević participated in the main draw of 11 Grand Slam tournaments, all in the men's doubles. He also played mixed doubles once, at the 1999 Wimbledon Championships, with Olga Lugina.

The Serbian teamed up with Macedonian player Aleksandar Kitinov in the 1997 Australian Open and the pair had a win over Jean-Philippe Fleurian and Nicolas Pereira. It was one of only two matches he won at Grand Slam level. The other came in the 1999 French Open, where he and partner Gábor Köves upset the famed Woodbridge/Woodforde combination, who were the third seeds. Although Đorđević never made the second round at Wimbledon, he came close. In 1999, partnering countryman Nenad Zimonjić, Đorđević lost a five set opening round match to Piet Norval and Kevin Ullyett, 8–10 in the fifth set.

He and Libor Pimek were semi-finalists at the Romanian Open in 1998. This would be the furthest he would reach in an ATP Tour tournament. On the Challenger circuit, Djorđević won six doubles titles.

Challenger titles

Doubles: (6)

References

1973 births
Living people
Yugoslav male tennis players
Serbia and Montenegro male tennis players
Serbian male tennis players
Sportspeople from Pančevo